Siamek Saleh-Farajzadeh is a paralympic athlete from Iran competing mainly in category F33 shot and discus events.

Siamek competed in the 2004 Summer Paralympics shot put and won the gold medal in the F33-34 discus.  Siamek was also due to take part in the discus in 2008 but did not start.

References

Paralympic athletes of Iran
Athletes (track and field) at the 2004 Summer Paralympics
Athletes (track and field) at the 2008 Summer Paralympics
Paralympic gold medalists for Iran
Living people
Year of birth missing (living people)
Medalists at the 2004 Summer Paralympics
Paralympic medalists in athletics (track and field)
Iranian male discus throwers
Iranian male shot putters
21st-century Iranian people